"Monday Tuesday... Laissez moi danser" is a 1979-released disco single by French recording artist Dalida. It was a number one hit and the biggest success of the disco period in France.

Description 
It topped the French chart in 1979, and had considerable success throughout Europe. The song was written by Toto Cutugno who offered it to Dalida and himself recorded it in Italian, under the title "Voglio l'Anima". Dalida recorded the song in three languages; French, Spanish; "Dejame Bailar", and English; "Let Me Dance Tonight". The English-language version was released on 7" single, backed with an English version of "Il Venait d'Avoir 18 Ans".

The French version of the song was released on her 1979 album Dédié à toi. It is also featured on numerous posthomous compilation albums.

A video was not made to accompany the original release; however, Dalida did make several TV appearances performing the song. A 2001 remix by French disco-artist Cerrone, which samples his 1981 track "Took Me So Long", is accompanied by a video, using archive footage and computer-generated effects.

Track listings

7" single 
 "Monday Tuesday... Laissez-moi danser" — 3:35
 "Comme toi" — 3:40

Charts

Star Academy version

In 2004, the song was covered by Star Academy 4 in France, under the shorter name "Laissez-moi danser". This version was released as single in September 2004 and was successful, reached number one for six weeks on the French and Belgian Singles Charts. As of August 2014, the song was the 27th best-selling single of the 21st century in France, with 505,000 units sold.

Track listings

CD single 
 "Laissez-moi danser" — 3:37
 "Laissez-moi danser" (remix) — 3:53
 "Laissez-moi danser" (instrumental) — 3:37

Certifications

Charts

References

 Dalida Official Website

External links
 Dalida Official Website "Discography" section

1979 singles
2004 singles
Dalida songs
Macaronic songs
Ultratop 50 Singles (Wallonia) number-one singles
Number-one singles in France
Star Academy France songs
Songs written by Pierre Delanoë
1979 songs